Breivika may refer to the following locations:

Breivika, Møre og Romsdal in Rauma municipality, Møre og Romsdal, Norway
Breivika, Troms in Harstad municipality, Troms, Norway
Breivika, a part of Tromsø, Norway

See also
Brevik (disambiguation)
Breivik (disambiguation)
Breidvik (disambiguation)